Giorgi (Gia) Tsetsadze (born on 3 September 1974) is a Georgian football manager.

Career
In 2011 Tsetsadze led FC Dila Gori to gain promotion to the Georgia top division (Umaglesi Liga). In 2013 he managed the Georgia national under-19 football team qualifying with it for the 2013 UEFA European Under-19 Championship. It was the second time the team qualified for such tournament and the first time since organization was shifted from under-18 competition to under-19.

In 2016 along with FC Samtredia Tsetsadze became a winning head coach in the Georgian national league and the first national title for the club.

In June 2020 Tsetsadze was placed at the head of the FC Lviv coaching staff. He will be helped by Vitaliy Shumskyi and Ihor Rypnovskyi.

Earlier in 2020 Tsetsadze resigned from the manager post of Saburtalo Tbilisi before the start of the 2020 Erovnuli Liga.

Honours
Samtredia 
 Erovnuli Liga: 2016 
 Georgian Super Cup: 2017
 Erovnuli Liga: Runners-up: 2015–16

References

External links
 Giorgi Tsetsadze at Footballfacts.ru

1974 births
Living people
Football managers from Georgia (country)
Expatriate football managers from Georgia (country)
Expatriate football managers in Ukraine
Expatriate sportspeople from Georgia (country) in Ukraine
Erovnuli Liga managers
FC Dila Gori managers
FC Lokomotivi Tbilisi managers
FC Samtredia managers
FC Saburtalo Tbilisi managers
Georgia national under-21 football team managers
Ukrainian Premier League managers
FC Lviv managers
FC Torpedo Kutaisi managers